trans-3-Methyl-4-decanolide is a chemical compound with formula , found in clary sage, in the juice of the blood orange, and in the extract of mandarin peel. It is a lactone with coconut-like odor.

The cis isomer is found in an African orchid.

See also
 trans-3-Methyl-4-octanolide, flavor component of oak-aged liquors.

References

Lactones